Joseph Lartey (born 14 July 1938) is a Ghanaian boxer. He competed in the men's welterweight event at the 1960 Summer Olympics. At the 1960 Summer Olympics, he defeated Karl Bergström of Sweden by decision in the Round of 32, before losing to Yuri Radonyak of the Soviet Union by knockout in the Round of 16.

References

1938 births
Living people
Ghanaian male boxers
Olympic boxers of Ghana
Boxers at the 1960 Summer Olympics
Boxers from Accra
Welterweight boxers